Qalat (also Romanized as Qalāt) is a village in Akhtachi-ye Gharbi Rural District, in the Central District of Mahabad County, West Azerbaijan Province, Iran. At the 2006 census, its population was 33, in 5 families.

References 

Populated places in Mahabad County